Luminis may refer to:

 Luminiș or the George Enescu Memorial House, a villa in Sinaia, Romania
 Luminis (software company); see rFactor 2
 Thyridanthrax luminis, a species of bee fly in the family Bombyliidae
 Vox Luminis, a Belgian early music vocal ensemble